The TOZ-106 is a small, lightweight bolt-action shotgun produced and sold by Tulsky Oruzheiny Zavod.

Design 
This is a compact version of Soviet MTs 20-01 hunting shotgun.

It features a metal stock that folds underneath the weapon in order to make it more compact, and a pistol grip. The rest of the stock is wooden. This shotgun was officially marketed as a hunting shotgun, but became popular among farmers, adventurers, travelers, campers, truck drivers and other people who needed a self-defense weapon for use in the countryside or wilderness. Illegal sawn-off versions of Soviet shotguns historically earned the name "Death of a collective farm chairman" (rus."Смерть председателя") hinting at their possible use, and TOZ-106 naturally inherited the name. It received a lukewarm welcome among hunters, though it is somewhat popular for finishing wounded game.

Users 

  - is allowed as civilian hunting weapon
  - used in private security companies
  - is allowed as civilian hunting weapon

References

Sources 
 А. И. Благовестов. То, из чего стреляют в СНГ: Справочник стрелкового оружия. / под. общ. ред. А. Е. Тараса. Минск, «Харвест», 2000. стр.418-419
 А. В. Кузьминский. Оружие для охотника: практическое пособие / под общ. ред. А. Е. Тараса М., ООО «Издательство АСТ», 2002. стр.228-229

External links
 Gallery
 Product page
 TOZ-106 / Internet Movie Firearms Database

Bolt-action shotguns
Shotguns of Russia
Tula Arms Plant products